The Safeway Stores Office and Warehouse Building is a historic building near downtown Kansas City, Missouri. The building was designed by Kansas City architects Archer and Gloyd and was built by local contractor J. H. Thompson in 1929. It served as Safeway's regional produce and canned goods warehouse, as well as the regional headquarters for the chain. The warehouse served a region extending from Topeka, Kansas in the west to St. Joseph, Missouri in the north, Columbia, Missouri in the east to Joplin, Missouri in the south.

The concrete structure is clad with brick and stone on the main (west) facade, while the remaining sides reveal the concrete. The interior is supported by concrete mushroom columns.

A loading dock was added in 1949. The facility was operated by Safeway until 1953, when it was purchased by the Halls Company. Another addition was made in 1976.

References

External links
National Register of Historic Places
National Register of Historic Places Registration Form

Commercial buildings on the National Register of Historic Places in Missouri
Buildings and structures in Kansas City, Missouri
Safeway Inc.
Warehouses on the National Register of Historic Places
Commercial buildings in Missouri
Commercial buildings completed in 1929
National Register of Historic Places in Kansas City, Missouri
Grocery store buildings